Nipe Glacier is a broad glacier between Austkampane Hills and Menipa Peak in the Sor Rondane Mountains. Mapped by Norwegian cartographers in 1957 from air photos taken by U.S. Navy Operation Highjump, 1946–47, and named Nipebreen (the mountain peak glacier).

See also
 List of glaciers in the Antarctic
 Glaciology

References
 

Glaciers of Queen Maud Land
Princess Ragnhild Coast